WILCO AG is a company with headquarters in Wohlen (Switzerland), which mainly produces sophisticated equipment for the pharmaceutical industry, as well as for the food, packaging, aerosol and can making  industries.
The machines are used for leak testing and automated visual inspection of containers, such as medicine bottles, vials, syringes, cartridges, ampoules, Blow-fill seal, IV-Bags, packaging, cans, and pouches.
The company is the global market leader for leak detection machines and trendsetter for inspection with a new inspection approach from lab to production.

History 
WILCO AG was founded in 1971 by Martin Lehmann. 
In 1983 the company moved into the building in Rigacker, 1994 was the first expansion, then in 2003 the second and in October 2010, the groundbreaking ceremony for a further extension. 
Since January 2013 Wilco AG belongs to Bausch + Ströbel (Ilshofen, Germany). The South German manufacturer of special machines is a family-based company as well.

Business 
The engineering, design and assembly of these machines are performed in a modern, state of the art plant at Wohlen.
In addition, the company is represented by over 30 representatives worldwide and in the United States with a service company.

See also 
 Webpage of Wilco AG

References 

Manufacturing companies of Switzerland